The Mount Union Area School District is a public school district based in Mount Union, Pennsylvania. The district encompasses approximately 151 square miles. According to 2000 federal census data, it serves a resident population of 9,678. The school district includes all of Mount Union borough, Mapleton borough, Shirley Township and Union Township in Huntingdon County. The school district also includes Kistler borough, Newton Hamilton borough, and Wayne Township, all located in Mifflin County.

Schools 
 Mount Union Area Senior High School - (Grades 9-12)706 N. Shaver StreetMount Union, Pennsylvania 17066
 Mount Union Area Junior High School - (Grades 6-8)  Pine StreetMount Union, Pennsylvania 17066

Starting in 2020-2021, there will be two elementary schools in the district after the closing of Mapleton-Union Elementary School.

 Kistler Elementary School   - (Grades K-2) Report Card 2010 154 School StreetMount Union, Pennsylvania 17066
 Shirley Township Elementary School  - (Grades 3-5) Report Card 14188 2nd StreetMount Union, Pennsylvania 17066

Career & Technology Centers
High school students can attend Huntingdon County Career & Technology Center - Mill Creek - Grades 10-12

Extracurriculars
The district offers a variety of clubs, activities and sports.

Athletics 
 Baseball - Class AA
 Basketball - Class AA
 Cross Country - Class AA
 Football - Class AA
 Boys Golf - Class AA
 Softball - Class AA
 Track and Field - Class AA
 Volleyball - Class AA
 Wrestling - Class AA

Music

Mount Union participates in competitive marching band in the Tournament of Bands Circuit. The group has earned much recognition within the circuit for numerous competitive victories. Additionally, the band has performed in highly visible parades such as: The West Virginia Strawberry Festival, New York City Veterans’ Day Parade, and the Washington D.C. Centennial Parade for the Boy Scouts of America.

Additionally, Mount Union was formerly home to a County-Wide Indoor Percussion Ensemble which hosted students from across Huntingdon County. Since 2022, the unit has been hosted by the Juniata Valley School District. The unit formed in 2015 and is composed of students from Southern Huntingdon County School District, Juniata Valley School District, Williamsburg Community School District, Huntingdon Area School District and Mount Union Area School District. The unit is a four time Atlantic Coast Champion In 2017, 2018, 2019, and 2022. The unit competes in the Tournament Indoor Association, sponsored by the National Judges Association.

References

External links
 Mount Union Area School District
 PIAA
Tournament of Bands

School districts in Huntingdon County, Pennsylvania
School districts in Mifflin County, Pennsylvania